The 1970 Mississippi State Bulldogs football team represented Mississippi State University during the 1970 NCAA University Division football season. The Bulldogs finished 6–5 for the only winning season in head coach Charles Shira's tenure. The 1970 squad included the first two African-American football players on the Bulldogs' varsity team, defensive back Frank Dowsing and defensive tackle Robert Bell.

Schedule

References

Mississippi State
Mississippi State Bulldogs football seasons
Mississippi State Bulldogs football